Fresno el Viejo is a municipality located in the province of Valladolid, Castile and León, Spain. According to the 2017 census (INE), the municipality has a population of 927 inhabitants.

Once a center of furniture manufacture, Fresno's economy now centers on agriculture. It has a notable Mudéjar church, Iglesia de San Juan Bautista, pictured on the right.

See also
Cuisine of the province of Valladolid

References

Municipalities in the Province of Valladolid